Return to Me is a 2000 American romantic comedy-drama film directed by Bonnie Hunt and starring David Duchovny and Minnie Driver. It was filmed in Chicago and was released on April 7, 2000 by Metro-Goldwyn-Mayer. It was Carroll O'Connor's final film before his death the following year.

Plot 
Bob and Elizabeth Rueland (David Duchovny and Joely Richardson) live and work in Chicago — Bob as an architect, Elizabeth as a zoologist at Lincoln Park Zoo.

On the night of her fundraiser for a new primate house, Bob promises Elizabeth he'll finish the building. Elizabeth is killed in a car accident leaving the fundraiser, and her heart is transplanted to artist Grace Briggs (Minnie Driver), who has suffered from heart disease since the age of 14 and is near death.

The surgery is successful; Grace is able to live a normal life for the first time and plans to make her first airplane trip to Italy to paint. Grace's best friend Megan Dayton (Bonnie Hunt), encourages her to start dating in spite of her self-consciousness about the long surgical scar on her chest.

Grace writes a letter to the donor's family after the surgery, thanking them for the heart she received; it takes her over a year to finally find the courage to mail the letter. Bob works to build the primate house Elizabeth raised money for; he is still depressed a year after her death. He recognizes that he must resume his life as he becomes frustrated seeing that his dog hasn't gotten over the loss either.

Bob's friend, veterinarian Charlie (David Alan Grier), organizes a blind date for him at O'Reilly's, a self-styled Irish-Italian restaurant. The date goes very badly, as his date is very obnoxious, petty and self-absorbed. However, Bob finds that he is drawn to the waitress — Grace, who is also the granddaughter of the restaurant's owner, Marty O'Reilly (Carroll O'Connor).

Although they are both unaware of the connection they have through Elizabeth's heart, Bob and Grace begin to date. As they grow closer together, she is reluctant to tell him about her medical history. After several months of dating, Grace finally decides to tell Bob about her transplant. However, before she gets the chance, she finds in his house the letter she had sent several months earlier.

Horrified by the discovery, Grace flees and tells Megan what has happened. Megan's husband, Joe, (Jim Belushi) becomes infuriated as he has misunderstood Grace's panic and thinks Bob must be married. Megan then explains the situation to him in six monosyllables: "Grace has Bob's dead wife's heart!" When Grace meets Bob again, she tells him the truth. Speechless, he leaves.

Against Megan's advice to not run away from the situation, Grace goes to Italy alone. Back at home, Bob realizes that although he will always miss Elizabeth, he "aches" for Grace. He decides to go after her, and they reunite in Italy. They return to Chicago for the dedication of the new primate house.

As the film ends we see Wally (William Bronder) and Sophie (Marianne Muellerleile) dancing happily at their wedding reception at O'Reilly's restaurant, and Charlie holding Joe and a visibly pregnant Megan's toddler, while they join Grace and Bob on the dance floor.

Cast 
 David Duchovny as Bob Rueland
 Minnie Driver as Grace Briggs
 Carroll O'Connor as Marty O'Reilly
 Robert Loggia as Angelo Pardipillo
 Bonnie Hunt as Megan Dayton
 David Alan Grier as Charlie Johnson
 Joely Richardson as Elizabeth Rueland
 Eddie Jones as Emmett McFadden
 James Belushi as Joe Dayton
 William Bronder as Wally Jatczak
 Marianne Muellerleile as Sophie
 Dick Cusack as Mr. Bennington
 Joseph Gian as Singer
 Tom Virtue as Dr. Sederak
 David Pasquesi as Tony
 Don Lake as Transplant Man
 Peetey as Mel

Reception 
The film received generally mixed reviews. Based on 99 reviews, it has a score of 62% on Rotten Tomatoes with the consensus reading "David Duchovny and Minnie Driver provide heart-warming romance and comedy in this solid debut by director Bonnie Hunt." Peter Stack of the San Francisco Chronicle stated, "Old-fashioned as all get-out, Return to Me is swathed in an unabashed feel-good tone." Roger Ebert called it "so innocent, so naive, so sweet and sincere, that you must leave your cynicism at the door or choose another movie."Entertainment Weekly'''s Lisa Schwarzbaum gave it a C+ grade, and stated "the alluringly deadpan Duchovny can make no headway with Driver." Jay Carr of The Boston Globe called it "ultimately too bland and safe."

The film opened at fourth place at the North American box office making US$7.8 million in its opening weekend, behind The Road to El Dorado, Erin Brockovich and Rules of Engagement, which opened at the top spot. It would make a total of $32,662,299 in its entire box office run.

 See also 
 Dil Ne Jise Apna Kahaa, a 2004 Bollywood movie with a very similar storyline.
 Summer Scent'', a 2003 Korean drama with a very similar storyline

References

External links 
 
 
 
 
 
 

2000 films
2000 romantic comedy-drama films
American romantic comedy-drama films
Films directed by Bonnie Hunt
Films scored by Nicholas Pike
Films set in Chicago
Films shot in Chicago
Magic realism films
Metro-Goldwyn-Mayer films
2000 directorial debut films
2000 comedy films
2000 drama films
2000s English-language films
2000s American films